Shelton Stromquist (born 1943) is an emeritus professor of history at the University of Iowa and a former president of the Labor and Working-Class History Association.

Education 
Stromquist graduated from Yale University with a history major in 1966 and earned a PhD at the University of Pittsburgh in 1981, writing a dissertation under the supervision of David Montgomery.

Personal life  
Stromquist was an active participant in the United States civil rights movement. Having first enrolled as an undergraduate at Yale University, Stromquist dropped out in 1963, traveling to India with the Experiment in International Living and studying and working in Germany from 1963 to 1964. He returned to work with the Student Non-violent Coordinating Committee as a volunteer, helping to organize the Mississippi Freedom Democratic Party and register African-Americans to vote in Vicksburg, Mississippi during Freedom Summer in 1964. He returned Vicksburg during the summer of 1965 to continue that work and after graduating in 1966 joined the "Meredith March" in Mississippi from near Greenwood to the outskirts of Jackson.  From 1966 to 1968 he served as a volunteer in Tanzania, East Africa with the American Friends Service Committee, working in Ujamaa (African socialist) villages.  Stromquist was also active in the antiwar movement in Milwaukee, Wisconsin from 1968 to 1971, first as a staff person with AFSC and then as a community organizer and volunteer with Casa Maria and the Catholic Worker movement.

Bibliography

Solely authored books

References

External links 
 

1943 births
University of Pittsburgh alumni
University of Iowa faculty
American historians
Presidents of the Labor and Working-Class History Association
Living people